Philip, Duke of Holstein-Gottorp (10 August 1570 – 18 October 1590) was the second son of Adolf, Duke of Holstein-Gottorp (1526–1586) and his wife, Christine of Hesse (1543–1604).

After the early death of his elder brother Frederick II in 1587, he inherited the ducal share of rule in the royal Danish-ducal condominium of the duchies of Holstein and of Schleswig at the age of 17.  He died three years later. Not much is known about his death but he might have died of natural causes . Rumours say that his brother Frederick was also close to him.

Ancestors

References 

|-

Dukes of Holstein-Gottorp
1570 births
1590 deaths
16th-century German people